The characters of Kamen Rider Decade exist amongst various iterations of reality within the series referred to as an A.R. World (Another Rider's/Alternate Reality World). The  are the A.R. Worlds that are based on the previous entries of the Kamen Rider Series that have aired during the Heisei period of Japanese history. Each differs in some way from the series on which it was based.

World of Kuuga
The  is the version of reality where Kamen Rider Kuuga takes place. It was the world where Yusuke Onodera originated from before he joined Tsukasa in his journey. Within this A.R. World, Tsukasa assumes the guise of a police officer with the talent of understanding and speaking the Gurongi language.

Ai Yashiro
She mistakes Decade for  after Decade destroys Baberu. While investigating the lair of the Gurongi to take out the resting Gamio, she and her group are overwhelmed by the miasma caused by the Gurongi leader's revival. However, Yusuke is unable to save her in time because the poison she breathed in later killed her. Prior to her death, she makes Yusuke promise that he will fight in order to protect everyone's smiles.

N·Gamio·Zeda
 is the king of the Gurongi in the World of Kuuga;, he is also called . He refers to himself as otherworldly because he should have never been revived, a fact that even he seems to believe, wondering why he was awakened. Though they obtain four kills, Tsukasa uses Ai as bait to lure the Gurongi out and gives her a nose bleed to ruin the Gegeru. The effects of the distortion revive Gamio anyway, and he uses his power to convert every human corpse within his Miasmic aura into a Gurongi. Although his ultimate goal is to have his sired Gurongi destroy each other, Gamio is destroyed by Kuuga and Decade performing a combo attack.

Gurongi

 : A hermit crab monster of the Me Group, labeled . He battles Kuuga and is destroyed by his Dragon Form's Splash Dragon attack.
 : A condor monster of the La Group, the judges of the Gegeru, labeled . He fights Kuuga and attempts to flee before being destroyed by Kuuga who uses Pegasus Form's Blast Pegasus attack.
 : A bison monster of the Go Group that is labeled . Baberu is forced by Decade to reveal the nature of the Gegeru before being destroyed by Decade's Dimension Kick.
 : A female sea snake Gurongi. She oversees Gamio's revival, she is destroyed by Decade.
 : A piranha monster that is one of the leading Gurongi overseeing Gamio's revival. He is destroyed by Kuuga's Mighty Kick when he attempts to intervene in the battle between Kuuga and Decade.

N·Gamio·Zeda is able to create various Gurongi from human corpses using his miasma, but some are later absorbed by him in a last effort to defeat Kuuga and Decade. The remaining Gurongi died after Gamio is defeated.

World of Kiva
The  is the version of reality where Kamen Rider Kiva takes place. Unlike the original series, this world allows Fangires and humans to coexist, with the King's servants destroying the rebellious Fangires. The backdrop that allows entry into the World of Kiva depicts a nighttime cityscape with Castle Doran emerging from a building. Within this A.R. World, Tsukasa assumes the identity of a violinist with the talent of playing a violin solo similar to those of Otoya and Wataru Kurenai.

Wataru
 is a twelve-year-old half-Fangire boy, having the ability to transform into  with the aid of Kivat-bat the 3rd. He finds the overseeing of the ceasefire between humans and Fangires a very troublesome and unnerving task due to his fear of making friends and losing control over his Fangire impulses around them. But events leading to the Beetle Fangire attempting to disrupt the peace allows Wataru gets over this fear and takes his place as the official King of Fangires.

He later appears in the World of the Rider War as his reality is absorbed into it. Leading the Riders of his world, Wataru refuses to listen to Tsukasa and Yusuke in uniting all Riders to defeat Dai-Shocker and stop the convergence of the worlds, while in grief over IXA's death. He even went so far to allow the Queen of the Fangires, Yuki, to marry Apollo Geist for the World of Kiva to have an advantage over the other A.R. Worlds, but later changes his mind when the Fangire betrayed them to Dai-Shocker. After defeating Super Apollo Geist, the convergence of the worlds continues and the World of Kiva and Wataru disappear. However, in Kamen Rider × Kamen Rider W & Decade: Movie War 2010, he is resurrected after Tsukasa has been killed by Kamen Rider Kiva-la. He later appears alongside the Riders of the Nine Worlds to revive Tsukasa and help him battle Super Shocker, assuming Emperor Form with the help of Decade's K-Touch and later uses Castle Doran to fight the Super Crisis Fortress.

Kivat-bat the 3rd

 reprises his role voicing Kivat-bat the 3rd in the character's World of Kiva incarnation.

Arms Monsters

The  are servants of Kiva, each the last of his kind. They are absorbed into Beetle Fangire's breast plate and shoulder armor when they question their new king's intentions of removing the human/Fangire coexistence law.

In addition to these alternate versions of the Arms Monsters, the original versions appear in the timeline within the World of Den-O in The Onigashima Warship, where the wayward Urataros, Kintaros, and Ryutaros hide within Jiro (Garulu), Ramon (Basshaa), and Riki (Dogga), respectively until they can be rescued.

Ryo Itoya

He is the first Fangire that Tsukasa and Natsumi encounter, and reveals to them the truce that exists between Humans and Fangires while posing for a photo in the Hikari Studio.

 reprises his role as Ryo Itoya in the character's World of Kiva incarnation.

Beetle Fangire
He was exiled for loving a human woman who gave birth to his half-breed successor, Wataru. Seeing the coexistence and peace between the two races as nothing more than a farce for his son's sake, the Beetle Fangire breaks the peace by attacking humans to gather their Life Energy and reclaim his title, even stealing Kivat from Wataru. His actions of removing the law to restart past conflicts between the two races provide the motivation for Wataru to step up and truly claim his place as King of the Fangires. In the end, he is weakened by Decade's Kiva Arrow, then fatally wounded by a Dimension Kick/Darkness Moon Break combo. Revealing that he knew of the Fangire's true identity and intent before he dies, Tsukasa plays a final song for him before the man shatters.

The Fangires

However, some of these Fangires are unable to follow this law due to their instincts. Each Fangire belongs to a specific class based on the animal form it takes. Several Fangires also appear in the first episode when Natsumi is trapped within the changing dimensions. They include the Shark, Moose, Horsefly, Rat, Mantis, and Seamoon Fangires. The Mantis Fangire later appears fighting the Beetle Fangire.
When the Beetle Fangire regains his title, the Swallowtail Fangire aides his master until he is shattered by Decade's Dimension Slash.

World of Ryuki
The  is the version of reality where Kamen Rider Ryuki takes place. Though no harm occurs to the Rider while in the Mirror World, a battle in the real world can be fatal and use of Vent cards outside a battle is forbidden. The backdrop used to arrive in this world shows Dragredder flying within the Mirror World as shown in a mirrored time display screen on a skyscraper. Within this A.R. World, Tsukasa assumes the identity of a lawyer and the ability to enter the Mirror World without a Card Deck.

Shinji Tatsumi
 is a young cameraman who works for the Atashi Journal, a popular magazine that covers the Kamen Riders and the trials. When the editor of the journal is murdered, Shinji becomes a Kamen Rider to decide the fate of the suspect. Like his namesake in Ryuki, Shinji has the ability to transform into  and use the power of his Contract Monster Dragredder. He later appears in Kamen Rider × Kamen Rider W & Decade: Movie War 2010 alongside the other Riders of the Nine Worlds to help in reviving Tsukasa and helps him battle Super Shocker, assuming Ryuki Survive with the help of Decade's K-Touch and later into his Ryuki Dragredder form with the All Rider Final Form Ride Card to fight the Super Crisis Fortress.

Ren Haguro
 is a former journalist of the Atashi Journal and Shinji's former best friend, mysteriously leaving the group three years ago without explanation. Like his namesake in Ryuki, Ren has the ability to transform into  and use the power of his Contract Monster Darkwing. When Reiko is murdered, Ren enters the Trial to find the Rider who possesses the Time Vent Card. After defeating Scissors, Ren encounters Decade in a brief confrontation before Zolda intervenes. Later while forced to fight Shinji who accuses him of playing a part in Reiko's death, Decade's fight with Imperer stops theirs. Soon after, Decade battles Knight with the former being the superior fighter until Abyss intervenes. After founding and defeating Odin, Ren acquires the Time Vent card at the cost of being too injured to use it himself, shortly when Abyss is revealed to be Reiko's murderer, with Shinji takes Ren's place, accompanied by Tsukasa to prevent Reiko's death from the hands of Kamata.

Reiko Momoi
 is the editor of the Atashi Journal who is mysteriously murdered when Natsumi finds her upon arriving in the World of Ryuki, with the Natsumi as the sole suspect of her murder. But Ryuki uses the Time Vent Card to alter time and prevent Reiko's death while exposing the murderer to be Kamata.

Other Kamen Riders
 : Scissors is a cheating Rider who uses the power of his Contract Monster Volcancer. He is labeled by the Journal to have a victory rate of 6.8%. He is removed from the trial by Knight.
 : A public prosecutor who sees Natsumi guilty. Zolda is a Rider who uses the power of his Contract Monster Magnugiga.
 : Verde is a Rider who uses the power of his Contract Monster Biogreeza. He lowers his guard when falling for Scissors' trap and is removed from the trial by Volcancer who destroys Verde's Advent Deck.
 : Tiger is a Rider who uses the power of his Contract Monster Destwilder. He is removed from the trial by Zolda's Giga Launcher.
 : Impaler is a Rider who uses the power of his Contract Monsters Gigazelle, Megazelle, Omegazelle, Negazelle, and Magazelle. He is removed from the trial by Decade's Final Attack Ride.
 : Odin is a Rider who uses the power of his Contract Monster Goldphoenix. He lets himself be removed from the trial by Knight's Final Vent allowing Knight to take the Time Vent Card.

Mirror Monsters

The  are a race of monsters that reside in the Mirror World. They often come into contact with the Kamen Riders of this reality. In the first episode, various Hydragoons are involved in the all-out battle among the monster groups that destroys the world.

 : A red Fenghuang monster in a Phoenix-shaped helmet. It is shown briefly fighting Kamen Rider Ryuki alongside Omegazelle and Zebraskull Bronze.
 : A black-headed zebra monster. It is shown briefly fighting Kamen Rider Ryuki alongside GuldThunder and Omegazelle.
 : A blue and yellow gazelle monster that often appears when Kamen Rider Impaler summons it.
 : A gazelle/cape buffalo monster that often appears when Kamen Rider Impaler summons it.
 : A gazelle/water buffalo monster that often appear when Kamen Rider Impaler summons it. One is briefly seen fighting Kamen Rider Ryuki alongside GuldThunder and Zebraskull Bronze.
 : A bighorn sheep/gazelle monster that often appears when Kamen Rider Impaler summons it.

Contract Monsters
The  are specific Mirror Monsters that are contracted to the Riders in this world. The following have made appearances in this show:

 : A giant mechanical vampire bat-like Contract Monster under Kamen Rider Knight.
 : A mechanical humanoid crab-like Contract Monster under Kamen Rider Scissors.
 : An armored humanoid white tiger monster that is Kamen Rider Tiger's Contract Monster.
 : A humanoid gazelle monster that is Kamen Rider Impaler's Contract Monster. It is often supported by the other Zelles.
 : A hammerhead shark monster with machine guns and missile launchers that is one of Kamen Rider Abyss' two Contract Monsters. Kamen Rider Abyss' Final Vent enables Abysshammer and Abysslasher to combine into a giant shark called  which is when it is destroyed by Decade and Ryuki Dragreder.
 : A shark monster with two saw-like swords and water-spewing abilities that is one of Kamen Rider Abyss' two Contract Monsters. Kamen Rider Abyss' Final Vent enables Abysshammer and Abysslasher to combine into a giant shark called Abyssodon which is when it is destroyed by Decade and Ryuki Dragreder.

World of Blade
The  is the version of reality where Kamen Rider Blade takes place. The backdrop used to arrive in this world shows a hand of facedown Rouse cards with the Ace of Spades (Blade's Change Beetle) face up. Within this A.R. World, Tsukasa assumes the role of chief waiter within BOARD and is given the ability to completely destroy Undead without sealing them.,

Kazuma Kendate
 is a Rank Ace employee of BOARD who has the ability to transform into  with the sealed Beetle Undead. However, due to his ranking, Kazuma is prideful to the point of seeing himself to be invincible. It is not until after he gets demoted while Tsukasa arrives that he realizes that ranking is not everything and that followers are just as important as leaders. Soon after helping him with the crisis occurring in his world, Kazuma thanks Tsukasa who is confident that he would look after the Ace Lunch. He later assigns himself as a president of the BOARD Corporation after Hajime/Chalice's defeat. He sometimes calls Tsukasa "cheese", rather than "chief", though it is not known if this is made purposefully or not.

Kazuma later appears in the World of the Rider War as his reality is absorbed into it, leading his Rider comrades and the Undead against Wataru's allies and the Fangire. Though at first he refuses to aid Tsukasa and Yusuke, Kazuma has a change of heart and joins in the fight against Super Apollo Geist with Kamen Rider Garren before the villain causes more worlds to merge into the World of the Rider War, destroying the World of Blade which causes its Riders to fade away as a result. However, he is resurrected following Tsukasa's death in Kamen Rider × Kamen Rider W & Decade: Movie War 2010 and helps in reviving him and battles Super Shocker, assuming King Form as a result from Decade's K-Touch and later transforms into his Jack Form to fight the Super Crisis Fortress.

Sakuya Hishigata
 is a Rank Ace senior employee of BOARD who has the ability to transform into  with the sealed Stag Undead. After Kazuma's demotion, he starts treating him badly until he himself got demoted after losing his Rider System to Chalice. He dies along with Kuroba after his life energy is absorbed by Hajime to create the Joker card.

A second Garren later appears in the World of the Rider War. This Garren eventually disintegrates together with Kazuma in the aftermath of Apollo Geist's merging of the Rider Worlds.

Mutsuki Kuroba
 is an employee of BOARD, originally Rank King but recently promoted to an Ace who has the ability to transform into  with the sealed Spider Undead. After he is promoted to Ace and Kazuma is demoted, he starts treating him badly while developing a superiority complex. Mutsuki is the last Rider to lose his Rider System along with Hishigata, learning of Chalice's true identity as he and Hishigata dies after their life energy were absorbed and used by Hajime to create the Joker card.

A second Leangle later appears in the World of the Rider War. This Leangle was killed by Wataru, grief-stricken over the death of Rising Ixa. After Tsusaka's death, he, like the others killed during the Rider War, is restored to life along with the World of Blade.

Hajime Shijo
 was the president of the BOARD Corporation who secretly uses the sealed Mantis Undead to assume the form of the legendary . Because he is more interested in business ethnics, Hajime sees himself as the only thing keeping BOARD alive by offering his company's aid once paid by the government. Furthermore, he conspires with Kamata by taking the other Rider Systems to begin a joint plan to take over the world by creating the Joker card from the DNA of all four Ace Undead. Being unable to get Kazuma to give him the Blay Buckle by normal means, Chalice makes his presence known during Decade and Blade's fights against the Paradoxa Undead and the other BOARD Riders, stripping Kazuma of his Blay Buckle before fighting Decade until Todoroki's sudden appearance. But Hajime escapes with the Garren Buckle as well, later taking the Leangle Buckle with his identity exposed to Hishigata and Mutsuki whom he abducts and sacrifices to complete the Joker card.

Unlike the original Kamen Rider Chalice, the Chalice Rouzer that Hajime Shijo uses is a Rider System rather than bestowed upon him.

Ai, Mai and Mi

Their names are a pun of "I", "my", and "me", respectively.

Kamata
Recruited by Narutaki, Kamata infiltrated the World of Ryuki as the sub-chief editor of the Atashi Journal while acquiring the dimension's Abyss Advent deck to become  while secretly murdering Reiko Momoi. Once Kamata's true identity as an Undead is exposed along with being Reiko's murderer, her death averted when Decade used Odin's Time Vent card to go back in time, he is returned to his homeworld by Naruki after his V-Buckle and Advent Deck were destroyed by Decade and Ryuki. Kamata later works with Hajime in a plot to take over the world as the chairman of the BOARD Corporation. After helping Hajime steal the three other Rider Systems, Kamata helps him create the Joker Rouse Card. He is later defeated alongside the Joker by Decade and Blade.

In the music video for "Journey through the Decade", his Paradoxa Undead form is summoned by Gackt to fight Tsukasa.

Undead

The  are a race of monsters that are accidentally released from their seals and go on a rampage. Among them, there are several specialized Undead: Category Aces, the Royal Club, and the Joker. Several Undead also appear in the first episode when Natsumi is trapped within the changing dimensions. They include the Lizard, Pecker, Squid, and Caucasus Undead.
 : The Eight of Spades Undead, he terrorizes humans until Kazuma and Hishigata confront him before receiving clearance to transform into Blade and Garren. In the end, the Buffalo Undead is defeated by Blade's Lightning Blast before being sealed into the Magnet Buffalo card.
 : The Jack of Clubs Undead, he is destroyed by Decade using Ryuki's Strike Vent.
 : The Queen of Spades Undead, he aids the Paradoxa Undead until he is destroyed by Decade's Dimensional Kick.

World of Faiz
The  is the version of reality where Kamen Rider 555 takes place. The backdrop used to enter the World of Faiz is a splitscreen featuring the Autovajin in Battle Mode and blue butterflies, referencing Smart Lady, a character from the original series who was Smart Brain Corporation's mascot of sorts. Within this A.R. World, Tsukasa assumes the role of a Smart Brain High student and is able to surpass the talent and intelligence of all of Lucky Clover, such as skills in tennis. Daiki's treasure in this world is the Faiz Driver, but eventually he relents and takes the unused Orga Driver instead.

Takumi Ogami
 is a hot-blooded boy who protects Smart Brain High from the Orphnoch, though his reason for doing this is a mystery. While he does not appear to help in reviving Tsukasa in Kamen Rider × Kamen Rider W & Decade: Movie War 2010 he still appears to help him battle Super Shocker, assuming Blaster Form with the help of Decade's K-Touch and later uses the Jet Sliger to fight the Super Crisis Fortress.

Yuri Tomoda
 is one of Takumi's fellow students, a member of Smart Brain High's photography club with a dream to create the perfect photo journal. She is not as good-willed as she initially appears, expressing being prejudiced to the Orphnoch as well as believing Faiz to be an urban legend. However, when targeted by the Lucky Clover members, Yuri learns of Takumi's true nature. The situation leaves her confused until she sees Takumi attempt to protect her camera, hearing his reason for becoming Faiz. After the fight, Yuri convinces Takumi to keep protecting Smart Brain High to protect her dream.

Momose
 is a student of Smart Brain High who is a member of : a group of top-ranked students who are actually Orphnoch. After learning the truth behind Faiz, Momose decides to take over the school and sire new Orphnoch from the student body. However, the Riders intervene and the Tiger Orphnoch is destroyed by Decade's Decade Photon.

Orphnoch

The  are humans who have entered the next stage in evolution, possessing heighten physical and other various special abilities. Several Orphnoch appear in the first episode where Decade assumes Faiz's form to fight them off. They include the Octopus, Okra, Pigeon, Dolphin and Rhinoceros Beetle Orphnoch.
 : Unable to become a student at Smart Brain High, she attacks a security officer until Faiz arrives and destroys her with his Sparkle Cut attack.
 : The only female member of Lucky Clover. Though she is resurrected by the Tiger Orphnoch, she meets her end against Decade's Decade Photon.
 : A jock member of Lucky Clover who is destroyed by Decade as Blade until the Tiger Orphnoch arrives and resurrects him into his muscular Majin Form. He is destroyed for good by Decade's Decade Photon. Genda is portrayed by CHIKARA.
 : A booksmart member of Lucky Clover who is destroyed by Diend's Dimension Shot while attempting to steal the Faiz Driver.

World of Agito
The  is the version of reality where Kamen Rider Agito takes place. Similar to the World of Kuuga, the Riders and the police battle the Gurongi. However, a new evil surfaces onto the world, monsters that they refer to as the Unknown. The backdrop used to enter the World of Agito is the elaborate tapestry seen in the opening sequence of Agito that depicts the story of Agito and the Unknown. This story arc further expands on the war between the Unknown and the Gurongi, which is hinted in both their respective series and explained more outside them. Within this A.R. World, Tsukasa assumes the role of a mailman with Toko's letter on his person. Due to the similarities to the World of Kuuga, Tsukasa more or less possesses the same talents in this world, as well as knowledge of the Unknown and the Agito Seed. Daiki's treasure in this world is the G4 Chip, but it's eventually destroyed by Toko.

Shouichi Ashikawa
 is a young man who supports the police, originally the user of the G3 system until he mysteriously disappeared. In reality, Shouichi left because he began to transform into , a partially evolved creature that is targeted by the Unknown. By the time the Unknown begin their attack, with Yusuke's help, Shouichi completes his metamorphosis into the evolutionary . While his world vanishes along with the others, he is revived after Decade's death and helps revive Decade. He later appears to help in the final battle with Super Shocker, transforming into Shining Form as a result of Decade's K-Touch and later into his Agito Tornador form with the All Rider Final Form Ride Card to fight the Super Crisis Fortress.

Toko Yashiro
, resembling Ai Yashiro of the World of Kuuga, is a scientist and the creator of the G-Series of Kamen Riders. Compared to Ai, Toko is more high-strung and sees the G3-X Suit as humanity's only hope. Toko also has some feelings towards Shouichi as Ai had for Yusuke, which was her motivation for building the G3-X suit. She monitors the condition of the operator and the G3 suit during combat from the G-Trailer mobile command base.

Hiroko Sato returns to Decade to portray Toko Yashiro in the World of Agito arc.

Taurus Ballista

Ballista embodies the Lords' purpose, which is to purge the world of any above average human, for the own good of humanity. However, Tsukasa tells him that they do not need someone to protect and limit humans and the Lord is destroyed by the teamwork of Decade, Agito, and Yusuke in the G3-X armor.

Lords

The  are a group of powerful animal-headed disciples with a wing-shaped protuberance sticking out of their shoulders.
 :  soldiers who serve Taurus Ballista and their queen Formica Regia.
 : The Queen Ant Lord and Ballista's right hand, aiding him until she dies taking Agito's Rider Kick which is meant for her master.

Gurongi

 : A bee monster that is labeled . This Me Group member battles the police until he is blasted to bits by G3-X's Cerberus.
 : A leopard monster that is labeled . She is a member of the Xu Group that appears in the World of Agito. She is murdered by two Ant Lords as she attempts to escape from Diend.
 : A mushroom monster that is labeled . He appears in the World of Agito. He is destroyed by the teamwork of Diend and the summoned Drake and Delta.

World of Den-O
The  is the version of reality in which Kamen Rider Den-O takes place. Unlike the other Riders Worlds, the World of Den-O is almost identical to the setting of the original series. The only difference is the interior of the DenLiner having changed to that of the New DenLiner. The backdrop used to enter this world depicts the DenLiner moving across the sands of time, which Ryutaros doodles on later in the episode arc. Within this A.R. World, Tsukasa finds himself wearing a trenchcoat and bucket hat, the same clothing as the Past Man and given abilities similar to those of a Singularity Point. Daiki's treasure in this world is the DenLiner. The World of Den-O arc coincides with theatrical release of Cho Kamen Rider Den-O & Decade Neo Generations: The Onigashima Warship, which takes place within the continuity of Decade like Kamen Rider Den-O: I'm Born! did with Den-O. And later Daiki returns to the World of Den-O to settle things with Reiji Kurosaki who transforms into Kamen Rider G Den-O in Episode Yellow: Treasure de End Pirates, part of Kamen Rider × Kamen Rider × Kamen Rider The Movie: Cho-Den-O Trilogy. His treasures are the pistol heirloom from the Kurosaki family and the Diend K-Touch which transforms him into a Complete Form.

Momotaros

Due to the actions of the Oni Brothers in the past, Momotaros loses his sense of self and is unable to retain his physical form outside the DenLiner, forcing him to use Tsukasa and Yusuke as host bodies to fight the Mole Imagin as Kamen Rider Den-O Sword Form. Momotaros, while possessing Yusuke, is attacked by Diend who wishes to turn him into the DenLiner. Together with Tsukasa, Momotaros regains his true form and they destroy the Alligator Imagin, the force behind the Mole Imagin attacks who he believed caused the crisis. But once Momotaros returns to the DenLiner and is reunited with Ryotaro and Kotaro, he learns the Oni Brothers are behind the distortions in their world, just as he disappears, finding himself on Onigashima as part of the Oni Conquest legend. Whenever Momotaros possesses someone, the person starts wearing a red scarf and has his/her hair spiked upwards, returning to normal when Momotaros leaves the body. He later helps Tsukasa in Kamen Rider Decade: All Riders vs. Dai-Shocker by assuming his Tarōs form with the Momotaros Final Form Ride Card and using the Kiva Arrow to assist Decade and Diend in defeating Ikadevil and his minions and in Kamen Rider × Kamen Rider W & Decade: Movie War 2010 where he assumes his Super Climax Form with the help of Decade's K-Touch and later uses the DenLiner to fight the Super Crisis Fortress.

 reprises his role voicing Momotaros.

Tarōs

Along with Momotaros, the smooth-talking turtle-like , the noble bear-like , and the childish dragon-like , collectively known as the Tarōs, provide Den-O the ability to become Rod, Ax, and Gun Forms respectively. For an unknown reason, the Tarōs have lost the ability to exist outside of time and in normal space, but they can now possess anyone at will in order to transform into Den-O. Urataros, Kintaros, and Ryutaros all possess Tsukasa, before possessing Natsumi and using her body to transform into Den-O to fight Decade, believing he's to blame for what is occurring. After Kohana disciplines the three from jumping to conclusions and using Natsumi's body, the three remained on the DenLiner. Once Momotaros returns to the DenLiner and is reunited with Ryotaro and Kotaro. Kotaro mentions the Oni Brothers being behind the distortions in their world, just as three Tarōs disappear with Momotaros, finding themselves in 1930, where they hid by possessing the original Arms Monsters of Kamen Rider Kiva and became rice thieves. Rescued by the DenLiner crew, they join the battle on Onigashima where they possess the summoned Kamen Riders G3, Caucasus, Ohja. Like Momotaros, the Tarōs also change the appearance of any person they possess: Urataros dresses them in a suave way (Tsukasa, for example, wears a white tuxedo and top hat under his possession), Kintaros gives them a feudal Japan-era look, and Ryutaros gives an 80s' hip hop style to the person, making him/her able to breakdance.

Sieg

 is a swan-based Imagin with an ego who occasionally aids the DenLiner gang, providing Den-O the ability to become Wing Form. Though the crisis of the World of Den-O is seemingly solved, Sieg appears in the Hikari Studio in the World of Kabuto in the possession of a manuscript of the Onigashima Conquest legend.

 reprises his role voicing Sieg.

Kohana

 is a little girl who lives on the DenLiner, her timeline having been erased from existence due to the Imagin going into the past. She can only exist because she is a Singularity Point, and not tied to the changes of time. She is the daughter of Yuto Sakurai and Airi Nogami, and the niece of Ryotaro Nogami.

 reprises her role as Kohana.

Naomi

 is the waitress of the DenLiner, known for her coffee that no Imagin can resist.

 reprises her role as Naomi.

Owner

The  of the DenLiner is a mysterious man with a habit of speaking in complexes when it comes to the nature of time. Owner enjoys eating various dishes that have a flag placed in the middle of them, aiming to eat his entire meal (usually rice or flan) without knocking the flags over.

 reprises his role as the Owner.

Kotaro Nogami

 is a young man from the future who can transform into . He is the grandson of the original Kamen Rider Den-O Ryotaro Nogami.

 reprises his role as Kotaro Nogami from Saraba Kamen Rider Den-O: Final Countdown.

Ryotaro Nogami

 is the original . During Decade's time in his world, Ryotaro was researching the time distortions with Deneb and Kotaro, and is subsequently affected by them, causing him to regress to a younger age. While he does not fight in the present day, he allows the Imagin to come together and form Kamen Rider Den-O Super Climax Form in the fight on Onigashima.

 reprises his role as the younger Ryotaro Nogami from the film Kamen Rider Den-O: I'm Born!.

Shilubara

He briefly appears during Den-O Ax Form's fight with Decade to acquire a vase for his brother Kuchihiko's agenda. Though ignored at the time, it would later turn out he is one of the true culprits behind the chaos in the World of Den-O.

Gelnewts
 are newt Mirror Monsters that serve as the Oni Brothers' foot soldiers. They are armed with giant shurikens that are mounted on their backs when not in use. They accompanied Mimihiko in acquiring the vase for their masters' agenda.

Alligator Imagin
Unlike other Imagin, the Alligator Imagin goes through a multitude of hosts to enact his scheme. Arriving in the past on December 30, 2008 via a child, the Alligator Imagin proceeds to change the future and overpowers Decade and Den-O, taking the latter's DenGasher as his own. Diend and his KamenRide Card summoned Riotroopers allow for Den-O and Decade to regroup, and allow for Decade to get the Den-O Cards. With both Kuuga and Den-O, Decade destroys the Alligator Imagin with the Den-O Final Attack Ride.

Imagin

The  are the creatures that arrive from the future to alter the past with only a handful standing against them. Several Imagin appear in the first episode when Natsumi is trapped in shifting dimensions attempting to get her to tell them her wish. These include the Spider, Bat, Molech, Bloodsucker, and Whale Imagin.
 : The Alligator Imagin's Imagin minions who appear throughout the World of Den-O. One is destroyed by Tsukasa as Den-O Sword Form. A few appear during Decade's fight with the other three forms of Den-O while Shilubara and his minions steal a vase.

World of Kabuto
The  is the version of reality where Kamen Rider Kabuto takes place. The backdrop used to enter this world depicts Tokyo Tower with an arm outstretched in homage to Souji Tendou's "walking the path to heaven" pose. Within this A.R. World, Tsukasa assumes the role of a ZECTrooper and given the ability to see in Clock Up space.  Daiki's treasure in this world is the Clock Up System.

Souji
 is a young man who has been given access to ZECT's technology, using the Kabuto Zecter to transform into . However, Kabuto's Clock Up System malfunctions, prompting ZECT to deem him a threat. Despite this though, he continues protecting his sister. Eventually, ZECT is able to capture Kabuto and finally initiate their plans for world conquest. However, thanks to the combined efforts of both Decade and Kabuto, the true threat is finally defeated. He later appears to help revive Tsukasa in Kamen Rider × Kamen Rider W & Decade: Movie War 2010 and battles Super Shocker, assuming Hyper Form as a result of Decade's K-Touch and later into his Zecter Kabuto form with the All Rider Final Form Ride Card to fight the Super Crisis Fortress.

Souji is portrayed by

Arata
 is an agent of ZECT under Otogiri who uses the Gatack Zecter to transform into . He is the only member of Otogiri's group to support Kabuto, and attempts to defend him. But when he sees Otogiri with Mayu, he attempts to reason with him before he is attacked by ZECTroopers, escaping them to call Tsukasa and the others for help as he learns that he and ZECT are being played by Otogiri.

Grandma
Following monk-like philosophies of peace and spouting amazingly appropriate zen-like phrases, she runs the  oden restaurant. It is later revealed that she is aware of her granddaughter being a Worm during her conversation with Tsukasa, and her grandson being Kabuto as she expresses her worries when ZECT finishes building the Clock Down system.

Mayu
 is the granddaughter of Grandma with a grudge against Kabuto for what she thought was brother's murder, only to later learn her 'brother' was actually a Worm.

Phylloxera Worm
The fact that he resembled Souji had Mayu confuse him to be her brother before he reveals his true form while carrying out the Kabuto Capture Plan to get his revenge while ensuring that the Worms gain the advantage over the ZECT Riders. He is destroyed by Kabuto's & Decade's Rider Kick as they tear down the Clock Down broadcast tower in the process.

The Phylloxera Worm originally appeared in the SmaSTATION special Kamen Rider G in which Decade and the other Heisei Kamen Riders make a cameo appearance at the end.

Worms

The  are an alien menace that blends into the human population by copying the faces of their victims along with their memories and personalities. While most are in pupa form known as a Salis, few Worms molt into an adult form with the ability to Clock Up. During the events of the first episode, a Culex Worm mimics Natsumi as it and its group, composed of the Geophilid, Sectio, and Sepultura Worms, attempt to kill her until Tsukasa becomes Decade for the first time.
 : A scarab-based Worm, the first of its kind Tsukasa encounters in the World of Kabuto while it assumes the form of a young man. After the ZECT Troopers confine it, Gatack and TheBee attempt to fight the Worm who overwhelms them in its Clock Up state. But with the unseen aid of Kabuto, the Worm is destroyed by TheBee's Rider Sting.
 : A centipede-based Worm that targeted Mayu, it is destroyed by Decade in Kuuga's Pegasus Form.
 : A crayfish-type Worm that posed as a young man and targeted Mayu, chasing her and Natsumi down until it is destroyed by a shockwave from Mayu's transformation into the Sisyra Worm.

World of Hibiki
The  is the version of reality where Kamen Rider Hibiki takes place. The masters and students of the Ongekidō styles wear traditional Japanese clothing, Tsukasa donning such attire while in the A.R. World and given the ability to use the Ongekibou. Daiki's treasures in this world are the three scrolls containing the secrets of the three schools of Ongekidō. The backdrop used to enter this world depicts a forest with a taiko drum in the foreground. Nearly all of the original cast of Hibiki returns to reprise their roles, with only Shigeki Hosokawa (the original Hibiki) and Rakuto Tochihara (the original Asumu) absent.

Asumu
 is Hibiki's child apprentice, wanting to become a full-fledged Oni just like his master Hibiki in the taiko drum-based  of Ongekidō. Asumu is the only student of the style, wearing a deep violet kimono with crimson accents (which was the outfit of his namesake from the Warring States era in Kamen Rider Hibiki & The Seven Senki, portrayed by Rakuto Tochihara). Before inheriting Hibiki's powers Asumu was able to assume a form similar to Transformed Kyosuke called , only shorter, muscular, silver and has no "mask". As a result of his master losing the ability to control his Oni powers, Asumu later inherits the power to become , and uses his new abilities to work together with Akira and Todoroki to ally their schools.

Asumu later appears in the World of the Rider War after his reality is absorbed into it, being the only survivor of the attack of the Fangires led by Kamen Rider Saga thanks to Daiki. After defeating Super Apollo Geist, the convergence of worlds is not stopped and the World of Hibiki and Asumu disappear. Following Decade's death, he is revived and reunited with his friends. He later helps revive Decade and then appears along with Wataru to aid Decade in the final battle with Super Shocker to repay Decade for saving his world, turning into Armed Hibiki thanks to Decade's K-Touch and later into his Hibiki Ongekikou form with the All Rider Final Form Ride Card to fight the Super Crisis Fortress.

Ibuki
 has the ability to transform into  who is master of the trumpet-based Ongekidō , running the Ibuki Lesson Studio. He and his entirely female student body wear uwagi with hakama; Ibuki has kataginu on top of the uwagi. After listening to Akira's reasoning and Tsukasa's advice, he discards his rivalry with Zanki and steps down as teacher in favor of Akira. He later fights without his "mask" against the Bakegani, wielding a trombone version of the Ongekidan Reppu.

Akira
 is Ibuki's head apprentice who has the ability to transform into , who visually resembles Ibuki. During Gyuki's rampage, she transforms and fights alongside Todoroki in order to save Asumu, all without Ibuki's permission. Braving his displeasure later, she and Todoroki convince Ibuki and Zanki that allying the three schools would be the best thing for the future of Ongekidō. With Tsukasa's help, they convince their masters, and she is promoted from apprentice to teacher. Akira later appears in the World of the Rider War after her reality is absorbed into it, killed by Kamen Rider Saga. However, when Decade is killed by Kiva-La, the World of Hibiki is restored along with Akira and Todoroki.

Zanki
 has the ability to transform into  who is master of the guitar-based Ongekidō , stationed at a dojo. He is Ibuki's rival and thus their schools are sworn enemies. Zanki and his entirely male student body wear karate gi; Zanki's gi is black and he wears a black haori over it. After being convinced by his student to give the idea of allying the three schools a chance, he steps down as mentor in favor of Todoroki. He later joins the fight without his "mask" against the Bakegani, wielding his Retsuzan.

Todoroki
 is Zanki's head apprentice who has the ability to transform into . Though a member of Zanki's school, he has feelings for Akira, and sides with her and Asumu when discussing how important allying the three schools is to the future of Ongekidō. Zanki is not pleased by such an idea, but with the help of Tsukasa and Akira, he manages to convince his master, and he is allowed to move from an apprentice role to teaching. Todoroki later appears in the World of the Rider War after his reality is absorbed into it, killed off while attacked by Fangires under Saga. But once Decade is killed, Todoroki and Akira are restored along with their world.

Hibiki
 is the master of the taiko-based Ongekidō Hibiki Style. Because he lost his righteous heart through his desire to become stronger, Hibiki is consumed by his Oni power and starts his metamorphosis into the legendary half-Oni half-Makamou, . As a result, Hibiki adopts a lazy and rude attitude to most people, wears modern clothing, and even attempts to drive Asumu away in an attempt to retire from being an Oni. It is only when Kuuga is about to get killed by a Tengu Makamou that Hibiki decides to assume his Oni form and transforms into Gyuki as a result, wounding Ibuki and Zanki before being driven away by their pupils. Knowing that he will no longer be able to assume his human or Oni form again should he transform into Gyuki, he gives up his Transformation Tuning Fork Onkaku to Daiki Kaito to give to Asumu, who becomes the new Hibiki and must slay his former master as his final request.

Makamou

The  are an assortment of monstrous creatures that usually dwell in the rural areas of Japan and consume any human beings as food. There are two main variations of this group: the bestial Giant Type and the humanoid Summer Type. In the first episode, Makamou such as the Bakegani and Ooari attack Natsumi while others like the Ubume were involved in the all-out battle among the monster groups that destroys the world.
 : A Summer Type snapping turtle/frog-like Makamou, it was first one that Tsukasa and company encounter before Asumu arrives to fight it. In the end, the Kappa is destroyed by Decade using Kabuto's Rider Kick.
 : A trio of Summer Type humanoid cat Makamou. While the first two are destroyed by Zanki and Ibuki, the last one evades them before being destroyed by Decade's Dimension Kick.
 : A Giant Type ant Makamou.
 : A Summer Type ape/parrot Makamou that attacked Hibiki and Asumu, overpowering Kuuga until Hibiki assumes his Oni form and destroys the Makamou.
 : A Giant Type oarfish Makamou with white bird wings.
 : A Giant Type swimming crab Makamou, larger than the average type with more pincers. It is released by Takeshi Asakura/Kamen Rider Ouja and appears with Narutaki riding on it once Gyuki is destroyed. The Bakegani is destroyed through the combined efforts of Hibiki, Decade, Diend, Amaki, Todoroki, Ibuki, and Zanki.

Notes

References

External links
 Cast and Characters at TV Asahi

Decade (Nine Worlds)